Mt. Bogd Golf Club is the first international-standard 18-hole golf course in Mongolia, located in the Bogd Khan Mountain, Ulaanbaatar, Mongolia. There are two other golf courses in Mongolia, yet none of them meets international standards with one having been built illegally by Korean investors.

Development
The project started in 2008 with investments from four large Mongolian companies, including MCS Holding and Skytel (Mongolia). The architectural design was developed by GolfPlan USA. In 2012, Mt.Bogd GC launched its testing operation. The course officially opened on June 22, 2013 and the Tourism Association of Mongolia hopes it will develop new types of tourism, namely golf tourism, in Mongolia.

References

External links
Official site
Mongolia Travel & Tourism News

Golf clubs and courses